Vexilla regis (The royal banner), WAB 51, is the final motet written by the Austrian composer Anton Bruckner.

History 

Bruckner composed it on 9 February 1892. The work, the manuscrit of which is archived at the Österreichische Nationalbibliothek, is based on the Latin hymn Vexilla Regis by Venantius Fortunatus. It was first performed on Good Friday, 15 April 1892, and was published in the same year by Josef Weinberger, Vienna.

In the Nowak-Bauernfeind new edition (Band XXI/29 of the ) the motet was re-issued with the revised text of the hymn and an additional 4-bar Amen.

Music 

Bruckner put strophes 1, 6 and 7 of the text in a motet of 108 bars in Phrygian mode for mixed choir a cappella.

Although it is in Phrygian mode the motet is characterized by Bruckner's typical modulations, often to rather distant keys and the integration of diverse musical styles: Bruckner biographer Howie remarks that "the remarkable mixture of the old and the new in this strophic piece could perhaps be interpreted as an attempt to sum up [Bruckner's] life's work". Its "bleaker and uncompromising" close is suited to the Good Friday story.

Selected discography 
The first recording of Bruckner's Vexilla regis occurred in 1931:
 Ferdinand Habel with the Choir of the St. Stephans-Dom, Vienna (78 rpm: Christschall 130A)

A selection among the about 40 recordings:
 Eugen Jochum, Bavarian Radio Symphony Orchestra & Choir, Bruckner: Symphony No. 7, Psalm 150, Motets – LP: DG 139137/8, 1966
 Matthew Best, Corydon Singers, Bruckner: Motets – CD: Hyperion CDA66062, 1982
 Philippe Herreweghe, la Chapelle Royale/Collegium Vocale, Ensemble Musique Oblique, Bruckner: Messe en mi mineur; Motets – CD: Harmonia Mundi France HMC 901322, 1989
 Uwe Gronostay, Netherlands Chamber Choir, Bruckner/Reger – CD: Globe GLO 5160, 1995
 Magnar Mangersnes, Domchor Bergen, Bruckner: Motets – CD: Simax PSC 9037, 1996
 Dan-Olof Stenlund, Malmö Kammarkör, Bruckner: Ausgewählte Werke – CD: Malmö Kammarkör MKKCD 051, 2004
 Petr Fiala, Tschechischer Philharmonischer Chor Brno, Anton Bruckner: Motets – CD: MDG 322 1422–2, 2006
 Philipp Ahmann, MDR Rundfunkchor Leipzig, Anton Bruckner & Michael Haydn - Motets – SACD: Pentatone PTC 5186 868, 2021

The large majority of the recordings are using the older score. Only a few recent recordings are using the score of the current edition of the Gesamtausgabe:
 Hans-Christoph Rademann, NDR Chor Hamburg, Anton Bruckner: Ave Maria – Carus 83.151, 2000
 Erwin Ortner, Arnold Schoenberg Chor, Anton Bruckner: Tantum ergo – CD: ASC Edition 3, issue of the choir, 2008
 Philipp von Steinäcker, Vocalensemble Musica Saeculorum, Bruckner: Pange lingua - Motetten - CD: Fra Bernardo FB 1501271, 2015

References

Sources 
 Max Auer, Anton Bruckner als Kirchenmusiker, G. Bosse, Regensburg, 1927
 Anton Bruckner – Sämtliche Werke, Band XXI: Kleine Kirchenmusikwerke, Musikwissenschaftlicher Verlag der Internationalen Bruckner-Gesellschaft, Hans Bauernfeind and Leopold Nowak (Editor), Vienna, 1984/2001
 Cornelis van Zwol, Anton Bruckner 1824–1896 – Leven en werken, uitg. Thoth, Bussum, Netherlands, 2012. 
 Uwe Harten, Anton Bruckner. Ein Handbuch. , Salzburg, 1996.

External links 
 
 
 Vexilla regis phrygisch, WAB 51 Critical discography by Hans Roelofs 
 Can be heard on YouTube:
 A live performance (Good Friday, 2011) by the Cantores Carmeli, Linz: Anton Bruckner – Vexilla regis
A live performance (24 June 2017) by the Student Choir of Utrecht: Vexilla regis – Bruckner | USKO

Motets by Anton Bruckner
1892 compositions